Featherwork is the working of feathers into a work of art or cultural artifact. This was especially elaborate among the peoples of Oceania and the Americas, such as the Incas and Aztecs.

Feathered cloaks and headdresses include the ʻahuʻula capes and mahiole helmets were worn by Hawaiian royalty; many are now on display at the Bishop Museum, and other museums across the world. Kāhili are a type of feathered standard, another symbol of royalty.  The introduction of foreign species, overhunting, and environment changes drove birds with desirable feathers, such as the ‘ō‘ō and mamo, to extinction, although the ʻiʻiwi managed to survive despite its popularity.

Mexican feather work was a Pre-Columbian art form which was continued after the Conquest of the Aztec Empire, originally organized by the Spanish missionaries into a luxury export trade, sending objects back to Europe. Immediately after the conquest existing objects such as Montezuma's headdress, now in Vienna, were admired in the courts of Europe.

Although featherwork is primarily used for clothing, headdresses, ceremonial shields, and tapestries, the Pomo peoples of California are famous for the minute featherwork of their grass baskets, many of which are on display at the National Museum of the American Indian in Washington.

The Maori of New Zealand used featherwork to construct cloaks for clothing and to decorate kete (bags) and weapons.

The Cherokee people of Southeastern Northern America used swan or turkey feathers to make capes.

See also
Coyotlinahual, Aztec patron god of featherworkers
The Feather Book of Dionisio Minaggio, a 17th-century Italian book of images made entirely from bird feathers

External links
Living the Ancient Hawaiian Way

 
Birds in art